Robert Alexander (b. 19 June 1788, d. 31 July 1840) was an Anglican priest in Ireland during the 19th century.

The fifth child and second son of Bishop Nathaniel Alexander, he was educated at Trinity College Dublin. He was Archdeacon of Down from 1814 until 1828.

His daughter Charlotte Melosina Elizabeth Alexander (ca. 1829–1900) died unmarried at Liscar, Amersham in March 1900.

Notes

Alumni of Trinity College Dublin
Archdeacons of Down
18th-century Irish Anglican priests
1840 deaths
1788 births